Latsga is a peak of the Greater Caucasus Mountain Range in the Svaneti region of Georgia.  Latsga's main glacier, Lekhzir, covers the mountain's southern slopes and portions of the adjacent valleys.

Notes 

Mountains of Georgia (country)